Fridtjof Nansen Land was a suggested but not officially adopted Norwegian name of a territory on the southern East Coast of Greenland, that was proclaimed by Norway on July 12, 1932, and occupied until April 5, 1933. It was named after Norwegian polar explorer Fridtjof Nansen. The short-lived territory occupied much of King Frederick VI Coast, which had been claimed a century before by the Danish crown.

The main settlements of the territory were Finnsbu in the north, with Trollbotn and Vogtsbu nearby, and Torgilsbu in the south.

Fridtjof Nansen Land was also a proposed name of the archipelago Franz Josef Land, a territory to which Norway had claims.

References

Further reading 
 Susan Barr: Norway, a consistent polar nation? Analysis of an image seen through the history of the Norwegian Polar Institute. Kolofon, Oslo 2003, 
 Gunnar Horn: Recent Norwegian Expeditions to South-East Greenland. Norges Svalbard- og Ishavs-undersøkelser, Meddelelse Nr. 45, Oslo 1939
 William J. Mills: Exploring Polar Frontiers: A Historical Encyclopedia, vol. 2 "ABC-CLIO", Santa Barbara 2003 , p. 273

Former Norwegian colonies
Greenland
1933 in international relations
Denmark–Norway relations
1930s in Norway
1930s in Denmark
1930s in Greenland
1932 establishments in North America
1933 disestablishments in North America
Territorial disputes of Norway
Fridtjof Nansen